Charles Joseph Sylvanus Apps  (January 18, 1915 – December 24, 1998), was a Canadian professional ice hockey player for the Toronto Maple Leafs from 1936 to 1948, an Olympic pole vaulter and a Conservative Member of Provincial Parliament in Ontario. In 2017 Apps was named one of the '100 Greatest NHL Players' in history.

Athletic career

Apps was a strong athlete, six feet tall, weighing 185 pounds, and won the gold medal at the 1934 British Empire Games in the pole vault competition. Two years later he represented Canada at the 1936 Olympics in Berlin, Germany, where he placed sixth in the pole vault event. After watching him play football at McMaster University, Conn Smythe signed Apps to play hockey with the Toronto Maple Leafs.

Apps played centre position with the Toronto Maple Leafs for his entire professional hockey career. His jersey number was 10. He was the winner of the first Calder Memorial Trophy in 1937, and the 1942 Lady Byng Memorial Trophy. Apps served as the Maple Leafs captain during the first National Hockey League All-Star Game October 13, 1947, at Maple Leaf Gardens. He also played for an all-star team competing in Montreal on October 29, 1939, to raise money for Babe Siebert's family.

Apps was in the prime of his career when he joined the Canadian Army during World War II at the end of the 1943 season.  He served two years until the war was over, whereupon he returned to captain the Leafs, winning 2 more Stanley Cups in 1947 and 1948.

Apps contemplated retirement following the 1947 Stanley Cup win, but returned in order to reach the 200 career goals milestone. With 196 career goals heading into the final weekend of the regular season, Apps scored 5 goals in the two weekend games to surpass his goal. Despite scoring 53 points in 55 games and setting a career high in goals, Apps retired from the NHL at the age of 33 and took a marketing job with the Simpson's department store. At the same time, he also served as the Ontario Athletic Commissioner.

Politics
While still playing hockey, Apps ran for parliament in the 1940 federal election. He was a candidate in the riding of Brant for the National Government Party but lost to incumbent George Wood of the Liberals by 138 votes.

Apps was a Progressive Conservative member of the Legislative Assembly of Ontario from 1963 to 1975. He represented the riding of Kingston from 1963 to 1967 and Kingston and the Islands from 1967 to 1975. He served as the Minister of Correctional Services from 1971 to 1974.

Cabinet positions

Death
On December 24, 1998, Apps died from a heart attack and was buried in Mountview Cemetery in Cambridge, Ontario. After his death, the Maple Leafs honoured his jersey number and George Armstrong's number, who both wore the number 10. Their numbers were not retired, as the Maple Leafs had a policy of only retiring numbers for players "who have made a significant contribution to the Toronto Maple Leaf Hockey Club and have experienced a career-ending incident while a member of the Maple Leaf team". However, this policy was changed for the Maple Leafs' centennial season, with Apps' number, along with 15 others, officially being retired on October 15, 2016.

Legacy
Apps was known for his athleticism, character, skating and play-making abilities (alongside a scoring touch, six times reaching the 20 goal plateau). He has been praised by Maple Leafs alumni, authors, historians and even competitors. Maple Leafs owner Conn Smythe called Apps the greatest player in franchise history, with teammate Howie Meeker noting his strong, consistent play. Ted Kennedy often spoke of his character. Jack Adams, famous for his managerial roles with the Detroit Red Wings, stated that Apps was the greatest centre he had ever seen. Boston Bruins legend Milt Schmidt called Apps the greatest player he ever played against, as did Ted Lindsay in relation to the centre position and gentlemanly characteristics.

In 1975, he was elected to Canada's Sports Hall of Fame and two years later Apps was made a Member of the Order of Canada.

Several institutions are named for him, including the Syl and Molly Apps Research Centre in Kingston, Ontario, and the Syl Apps Youth Centre in Oakville, Ontario. The sports arena in his home town of Paris is named the Syl Apps Community Centre.

In 1997, Syl Apps was inducted into the Ontario Sports Hall of Fame. Unveiled by the Ontario Sports Hall of Fame on January 13, 1998, the Syl Apps Award is emblematic of Ontario's Athlete of the Year.

In 2001, Canada Post included Apps in a series of NHL All-Star 47-cent postage stamps.

The National Hockey League itself listed Apps as one of the 100 Greatest Players to ever play in the league as part of the league's centennial celebrations in 2017.

Family
Apps and wife Mary Josephine had five children, Joanne, Robert, Carol, Janet and son Syl Apps Jr. (the latter also played the NHL). His granddaughter (and daughter of Syl Jr.) Gillian Apps won the gold medal in the 2006 Winter Olympics, the 2010 Winter Olympics, and the 2014 Winter Olympics for Canada's women's ice hockey team, and his grandson Syl Apps III was a college hockey star at Princeton University and played four years in the minor leagues. His grandson Darren Barber won a gold medal at the 1992 Barcelona Olympics in the men's 8 in rowing. Barber is now a family doctor in Peterborough, Ontario.

NHL awards and achievements
 Calder Memorial Trophy winner in 1937.
 Selected to the NHL Second All-Star Team in 1938, 1941, and 1943.
 Selected to the NHL First All-Star Team in 1939, and 1942.
 Lady Byng Memorial Trophy winner in 1942.
 Stanley Cup champion in 1942, 1947, and 1948.
 Inducted into the Hockey Hall of Fame in 1961.
 Inducted into Canada's Sports Hall of Fame in 1975.
 In 1998, he was ranked number 33 on The Hockey News' list of the 100 Greatest Hockey Players.
 #10 jersey retired by the Toronto Maple Leafs.
 In January 2017, Apps was part of the first group of players to be named one of the '100 Greatest NHL Players' in history.

Career statistics 

* Stanley Cup Champion.

Electoral record

See also
List of NHL players who spent their entire career with one franchise

References

External links 

1915 births
1998 deaths
Canadian Army personnel
Canadian military personnel from Ontario
Athletes (track and field) at the 1934 British Empire Games
Athletes (track and field) at the 1936 Summer Olympics
Calder Trophy winners
Canadian ice hockey centres
Canadian male pole vaulters
Canadian Army personnel of World War II
Canadian people of English descent
Canadian sportsperson-politicians
Commonwealth Games gold medallists for Canada
Commonwealth Games medallists in athletics
Hockey Hall of Fame inductees
Ice hockey people from Ontario
Lady Byng Memorial Trophy winners
McMaster Marauders football players
Members of the Executive Council of Ontario
Members of the Order of Canada
Conservative Party of Canada (1867–1942) candidates for the Canadian House of Commons
Olympic track and field athletes of Canada
Progressive Conservative Party of Ontario MPPs
Stanley Cup champions
Toronto Maple Leafs players
Sportspeople from the County of Brant
Sportspeople from Kingston, Ontario
Medallists at the 1934 British Empire Games